Children's Christmas Songs is the sixth studio album by Dutch-Australian children's music performer Fanciscus Henri.

The album was issued in 1981 under John Bye Records on cassette; and then re-released by Move Records on CD in 1989.  The rights then belonged to Franciscus Henri Productions.

Track listing
Christmas Bells (F.Henri)
Away in a Manger (Trad - F.Henri)
Hey, Hey It's Cold Tonight (F.Henri)
Silent Night
Twinkle, Twinkle, Little Star
My Sweet Santa
Isn't He a Lovely Baby (F.Henri)
I Saw Three Ships
Children from One to Ninety Four (F.Henri)
Jingle Bells
Borning Day
While Shepherds Watched
Hark in the Stable (F.Henri)
It's a Long Way (F.Henri)
We Three Kings
We Wish You a Merry Christmas
Ding Dong Who Rang the Bell
Once in Royal David's City

1981 Christmas albums
Franciscus Henri albums
Children's music albums
Christmas albums by Dutch artists